The Mali women's national under-20 football team represents Mali in international youth women's football competitions.

The team competed in the women's tournament at the 2019 African Games held in Rabat, Morocco.

The team qualified for the 2022 WAFU U20 Women's Cup to be held in Ghana.

See also 
 Mali women's national football team

References 

under-20
African women's national under-20 association football teams